Griffin Nunatak is a flat-topped nunatak about  long, standing between Ambalada Peak and Terminal Peak in the Prince Albert Mountains of Oates Land, Antarctica. It was mapped by the United States Geological Survey from surveys and U.S. Navy air photos, 1956–62, and was named by the Advisory Committee on Antarctic Names for Lieutenant William R. Griffin, U.S. Navy, officer in charge at South Pole Station, winter party 1966.

References

Nunataks of Oates Land